Prominence and Demise is the third full-length album by Norwegian progressive metal band Winds, released on September 4, 2007.

Track listing
 "Universal Creation Array" - 8:20
 "Distorted Dimensions" - 4:34
 "The Grand Design" - 6:20
 "When the Dream of Paradise Died" - 5:10
 "Fall and Rise" - 7:17
 "The Darkest Path" - 5:05
 "Convictions and Contradictions" - 3:39
 "Where the Cold Winds Blow" - 6:52
 "The Last Line" - 8:09

Personnel

Personnel
Lars E. Si (Age of Silence, ex-Khold, Tulus) - Vocals
Carl August Tidemann (ex-Arcturus) - Guitars
Andy Winter (Age of Silence) - Piano, keyboards
Hellhammer (Age of Silence, Arcturus, ex-The Kovenant, Mayhem) - Drums

Additional musicians
Agnete M. Kirkevaag – Soprano Voices (Madder Mortem)
Lars Nedland – Alto Voices (Age of Silence, Borknagar, Solefald)
Dan Swanö – Tenor Voices, Death Growls (Edge of Sanity, Nightingale, Second Sky, ex-Bloodbath)
Øystein Moe – Bass (ex. Tritonus, Ulver)

Oslo Philharmonic Orchestra
Andre Orvik – First Violin
Vegard Johnsen – Second Violin
Dorthe Dreier – Viola
Hans Josef Groh – Cello

External links
 kvltsite.com review

Winds (band) albums
2007 albums